Eryptosis (Erythrocyte apoptosis or Red blood cell programmed death) is a type of apoptosis that occurs in injured erythrocytes (RBCs) due to various factors including hyperosmolarity, oxidative stress, energy depletion, heavy metals exposure or xenobiotics. Like apoptosis, eryptosis is characterized by cell shrinkage, membrane blebbing, activation of proteases, and phosphatidylserine exposure at the outer membrane leaflet.


Causes
Conditions with excessive eryptosis include:
 G6PD deficiency
 Iron deficiency anemia
 Lead or mercury intoxication
 Lopinavir
 Malaria
 Ritonavir
 Sickle cell anemia
 Thalassemia

References

Red blood cell disorders